Year 1480 (MCDLXXX) was a leap year starting on Saturday (link will display the full calendar) of the Julian calendar.

Events 
<onlyinclude>

January–December 
 March 6 – Treaty of Toledo: Ferdinand and Isabella of Spain recognize the African conquests of Afonso V of Portugal, and he cedes the Canary Islands to Spain (see Treaty of Alcáçovas).
 July 28
 Mehmed II fails in his attempt to capture Rhodes from the Knights of Rhodes.
 An Ottoman army lands near Otranto, Italy. Pope Sixtus IV calls for a crusade to drive it away.
 August 12 -  Ottoman invasion of Otranto: Ottoman troops behead 800 Christians for refusing to convert to Islam. The Martyrs of Otranto are canonized in 2013.
 September 27 – Consorts and co-rulers Ferdinand II of Aragon and Isabella I of Castile initiate the Spanish Inquisition (looking for heretics and unconverted Jews).
 October – Great Stand on the Ugra River: Muscovy becomes independent from the Golden Horde. The Theotokos of Vladimir icon is credited with saving Moscow.

Date unknown 
 The Lighthouse of Alexandria's final remains disappear when Qaitbay, Sultan of Egypt, builds the Citadel of Qaitbay on its site.
 Magdalen College School, Oxford, is established by William Waynflete.

Births 
 January 10 – Margaret of Austria, Regent of the Netherlands (d. 1530)
 February 12 – Frederick II of Legnica, Duke of Legnica from 1488 (until 1495 and 1505 with his brothers) (d. 1547)
 February 13 – Girolamo Aleandro, Italian Catholic cardinal (d. 1542)
 April 10 – Philibert II, Duke of Savoy (d. 1504)
 April 18 – Lucrezia Borgia, Duchess of Ferrara (d. 1519)
 June 1 – Tiedemann Giese, Catholic bishop from Danzig (Gdańsk) in Poland (d. 1550)
 July 5 – Philip of the Palatinate, Bishop of Freising and Naumburg (d. 1541)
 October 1 – Saint Cajetan, Italian Catholic priest and religious reformer (d. 1547)
 November 10 – Bridget of York, English nun (d. 1517)
 October – Saint Cajetan, founder of the Theatines (d. 1547)
 date unknown
 Fernão de Magalhães, Portuguese navigator (d. 1521)
 Vannoccio Biringuccio, Italian metallurgist (d. 1539)
 Claude Garamond, French publisher (d. 1561)
 Giovanni Guidiccioni, Italian poet (d. 1541)
 Ferdinand Magellan, Portuguese explorer (d. 1521)
 Jerzy Radziwiłł, Polish nobleman (d. 1541)
 Gazi Husrev-beg, Ottoman statesmen (d. 1541)
 Palma il Vecchio, Italian painter (d. 1528)
 probable
 Arasibo, Taino Cacique
 Hans Baldung, German painter (d. 1545)
 Matteo Bandello, Italian novelist (d. 1562)
 Johann Georg Faust, German alchemist (d. 1540)
 Anna Taskomakare, Swedish merchant craftswoman and estate owner (d. after 1528)
 Jumacao, Taino Cacique
 Conn O'Neill, 1st Earl of Tyrone (d. 1559)
 Marcantonio Raimondi, Italian engraver (d. c. 1534)
 Elizabeth Boleyn, Countess of Wiltshire (d. 1538)

Deaths 

 January 5 – Jakobus, nobleman from Lichtenberg in the northern part of Alsace (b. 1416)
 April 14 – Thomas de Spens, Scottish statesman and prelate (b. c. 1415)
 May 10 – Philipp I, Count of Hanau-Lichtenberg (1458–1480) (b. 1417)
 May 19 – Jan Długosz, Polish historian (b. 1415)
 May 25 – William III, Count of Henneberg-Schleusingen (b. 1434)
 June 6 – Vecchietta, Italian painter, sculptor and architect (b. c. 1410)
 July 6 – Antonio Squarcialupi, Italian composer (b. 1416)
 July 10 – René of Anjou, king of Naples (b. 1409)
 July 15 – John III, Count of Nassau-Weilburg, German nobleman (b. 1441)
 July 26 – Ruprecht of the Palatinate, Archbishop and Prince Elector of Cologne (b. 1427)
 September 1 – Ulrich V, Count of Württemberg (b. 1413)
 October 4 – Jakub of Sienno, medieval Bishop Kraków in the years 1461–1463 (b. 1413)
 October 18 – Uhwudong, Korean dancer (b. 1440)
 November 20 – Eleanor of Scotland, Scottish princess  (b. 1433)
 November 29 – Frederick I, Count Palatine of Simmern (b. 1417)
 December 14 – Niccolò Perotti, Italian humanist scholar (b. 1429)
 date unknown
 Nicolas Jenson, French engraver (b. 1420)
 Tristão Vaz Teixeira, Portuguese explorer (b. c. 1395)
 Antonio Vivarini, Italian painter (b. c. 1440)
 Joana de Castre, Catalan noble (b. 1430)

References